Rural Township is a township in Kingman County, Kansas, USA.  As of the 2000 census, its population was 359.

Geography
Rural Township covers an area of 36.19 square miles (93.73 square kilometers); of this, 0.01 square miles (0.03 square kilometers) or 0.03 percent is water. The stream of Morisse Creek runs through this township.

Cities and towns
 Cunningham (south half)

Adjacent townships
 Dresden Township (north)
 Eureka Township (northeast)
 Union Township (east)
 Peters Township (southeast)
 Kingman Township (south)
 Township No. 11 Township, Pratt County (west)
 Township No. 12 Township, Pratt County (west)
 Township No. 6 Township, Pratt County (northwest)

Cemeteries
The township contains two cemeteries: Cunningham and Rural.

Major highways
 U.S. Route 54

References
 U.S. Board on Geographic Names (GNIS)
 United States Census Bureau cartographic boundary files

External links
 US-Counties.com
 City-Data.com

Townships in Kingman County, Kansas
Townships in Kansas